Brendel Anstey (November 1887 – 9 December 1933) was a footballer who played in the Football League for Aston Villa and Leicester City.

Born in Bristol, England, Anstey was a goalkeeper, who played for Bristol Rovers before signing for Aston Villa in February 1911 in a swap deal with James Jones, playing for them for four seasons until the outbreak of World War I. He went on to play for Leicester City after the war.

He died on 9 December 1933 in Wednesbury, aged 46.

References

English footballers
Hanham Athletic F.C. players
Bristol Rovers F.C. players
Aston Villa F.C. players
Leicester City F.C. players
English Football League players
Association football goalkeepers
Mid Rhondda F.C. players
1933 deaths
Wednesbury Old Athletic F.C. players
Footballers from Bristol
1887 births